Freak XXI is a Spanish Industrial metal band. To date they have published 4 releases; El anfitrión, Semihumanos, Música Ordenada, and Re-Cycle, which was self-published. They sing their songs in both Spanish and recently, English. Their style is a mix of electropunk, and hardcore metal, which the band has described as "industrial electro-punk".

History
Some of the members originally met in the thrash metal band "Ktulu", forming Freak XXI as a more industrial, post-thrash oriented project. Ktulu has also since turned towards industrial-style music.

Discography
 Semihumanos (CD, Album)
 Re-Cycle (CD, Album)
 El Anfitrión (CD, EP)		
 Musica Ordenada (CD, EP)

Other appearances
Their song "F.F.B." was featured in the Spanish film Fausto 5.0, a modern take on the Faust legend. It plays during the nightclub scene.
The song "P.I.N." was featured in the Xbox Video Game Crackdown.
The song "Zero" was featured in the Xbox Video game Project Gotham Racing.

External links
 Freak XXI at Last.fm
 Freak XXI at Myspace.com

Musical groups established in 1998
Spanish musical groups
Musical quintets